Véra Gibson-Amado, known professionally as Véra Clouzot, (30 December 1913 – 15 December 1960) was a Brazilian-French film actress and screenwriter. She is known for playing Linda in The Wages of Fear (1953), Christina Delassalle in Les Diaboliques (1955), and Lucie in Les Espions (1957). Clouzot also co-wrote the screenplay for La Vérité (1960). Her husband, director Henri-Georges Clouzot, named his production company after her, Véra Films.

Early life
Writer Jorge Amado was her second cousin.

In 1941, Véra met French actor , a member of the theater company of Louis Jouvet who toured in Brazil during World War II. Vera married the actor, taking part in the company's South American tour that lasted almost four years.

Career in France
After World War II, Vera settled in Paris. Louis Jouvet took over the direction of the Athenée Theater, while she continued to do small roles.

Véra met film director Henri-Georges Clouzot through her then-husband, Léo Lapara, who had minor parts in Quai des Orfèvres (1947) and Return to Life (1949), in the segment directed by Clouzot, "Le Retour de Jean".

Véra worked as a continuity assistant on Clouzot's Miquette (1950), and they married in 1950. Clouzot named his production company, Véra Films, after his wife. She made only three films, all directed by her husband. The sole female role in The Wages of Fear (1953), Linda, is played by Véra. Clouzot wrote the role specifically for his wife, as the character does not exist in the original novel. The Wages of Fear is about a South American town where a group of desperate men are offered money to drive trucks carrying nitroglycerin through rough terrain to put out an oil well fire. The Wages of Fear was the 4th highest-grossing film in France in 1953, and was seen by nearly 7 million spectators.

The most notable of Clouzot's films starring Véra was the classic thriller, Les Diaboliques (1955), co-starring Simone Signoret. She also starred in Les Espions (1957), and co-wrote the screenplay for the film La Vérité (1960), which was also directed by her husband.

Clouzot and Véra took a film crew with them to Véra's homeland in Brazil for their honeymoon, where Clouzot made his first attempt at directing a documentary film. The Brazilian government took issue with Clouzot filming the poverty of people in the favelas rather than the more picturesque parts of Brazil. The film was never finished because the costs became too high. Clouzot became fascinated with the region and wrote a book, Le cheval des dieux, recounting his trip.

Death
Véra died in Paris in 1960, aged 46, from a heart attack, shortly after the filming of La Vérité. Henri-Georges Clouzot fell into a depression over her death. After her funeral, he moved to Tahiti, but returned to France in December 1961. She is buried in the Montmartre Cemetery in Paris.

Filmography

References

Sources

External links

 
 

1913 births
1960 deaths
Brazilian film actresses
Actresses from Rio de Janeiro (city)
French film actresses
20th-century Brazilian actresses
20th-century French actresses
Brazilian expatriates in France
Burials at Montmartre Cemetery
Henri-Georges Clouzot